This is a list of flag bearers who have represented Iraq at the Olympics.

Flag bearers carry the national flag of their country at the opening ceremony of the Olympic Games.

See also
Iraq at the Olympics

References

Iraq at the Olympics
Iraq
Olympic flagbearers
Olympic flagbearers